Balakhninsky Uyezd (Балахнинский уезд) was one of the subdivisions of the Nizhny Novgorod Governorate of the Russian Empire. It was situated in the northwestern part of the governorate. Its administrative centre was Balakhna.

Demographics
At the time of the Russian Empire Census of 1897, Balakhninsky Uyezd had a population of 141,694. Of these, 99.5% spoke Russian, 0.1% Polish, 0.1% Belarusian, 0.1% Tatar and 0.1% German as their native language.

References

 
Uezds of Nizhny Novgorod Governorate
Nizhny Novgorod Governorate